Velos (Greek: Τ/Β Βέλος, "Arrow") was a  that served in the Royal Hellenic Navy from 1907 to 1926.

The ship, along with her three sister ships, was ordered from Germany in 1905 and was built in the Vulcan shipyard at Stettin.

During World War I, Greece did not enter the war on the side of the Triple Entente until 1917 and, due to Greece's neutrality the four Niki-class ships had been seized by the Allies in October 1916, taken over by the French in November and served in the French Navy from 1917-18. By 1918, they were back on escort duty under Greek colors, mainly in the Aegean Sea.

 Velos saw action in the Greco-Turkish War (1919-1922).  In 1918, after the Armistice of Moudros, Velos entered the Dardanelles with the Allied fleet and was, under the command of Lieutenant Commander Petros Voulgaris, the first Greek warship to enter Constantinople.  In 1919, she conducted escort missions in the Black Sea carrying Greek refugees from Pontus.

Velos was stricken in 1926, while the two remaining Niki-class ships were refurbished.

See also

History of the Hellenic Navy

Sources
 Official Website of Velos 

Niki-class destroyers
Ships built in Stettin
1907 ships
World War I destroyers of France
World War I destroyers of Greece
Military units and formations of Greece in the Balkan Wars